Coalport/North Clinton is a neighborhood located within the city of Trenton in Mercer County, New Jersey, United States. It contains the smaller enclave of Ewing/Carroll.

References

Neighborhoods in Trenton, New Jersey